The 1993–94 Slovenian Football Cup was the third season of the Slovenian Football Cup, Slovenia's football knockout competition.

Qualified clubs

1992–93 Slovenian PrvaLiga members
Beltinci
Celje
Gorica
Izola
Koper
Krka
Ljubljana
Maribor
Mura
Nafta Lendava
Naklo
Olimpija
Rudar Velenje
Slovan
Steklar
Svoboda
Zagorje
Železničar Maribor

Qualified through MNZ Regional Cups
MNZ Ljubljana:  Rudar Trbovlje, Šmartno Ljubljana
MNZ Maribor: Dravograd, Rače
MNZ Celje: Šmartno ob Paki
MNZ Koper: Jadran Dekani
MNZ Nova Gorica: Primorje
MNZ Murska Sobota: Veržej, Rogašovci
MNZ Lendava: Turnišče
MNZG-Kranj: Jesenice, Lesce
MNZ Ptuj: Drava Ptuj, Aluminij

First round

|}

Round of 16

|}

Quarter-finals

|}

Semi-finals

|}

Final

First leg

Second leg

Slovenian Football Cup seasons
Cup
Slovenian Cup